The ta'wiz, tawiz,  muska (Turkish) or taʿwīdh is an amulet or locket worn for good luck and protection common in South Asia.

Tawiz is sometimes worn by certain Muslims with the belief of getting protection or blessings by virtue of what is in it. In many cases, however, such amulets contain hieroglyphic signs or other written things indicating magical practices.  

Moreover, having superstitious beliefs was categorically prohibited by the Prophet Muhammad as the doer commits the act of Shirk. The same also applies to the early Muslim generations, such as his Companions, their followers and the Salaf  in general. 

It is intended to be an amulet. The word ta'wiz is used to refer to other types of amulets. It may be a pendant, carvings on metal, or even framed duas.

Tawiz worn by Hindus often bears the Om symbol sacred in that religion and is referenced in Hindi literature.

Etymology 
The word ta'wiz, used in Urdu and Hindi comes from the Arabic. The Arabic word taʿwīdh, meaning "amulet" or "charm" is formed from the verb ʿawwadha, which means "to fortify someone with an amulet or incantation".

See also
Al-Falaq
Al-Fatiha
Al-Nas
Throne Verse
Kautuka
Mannat
Nazar (amulet)

References

Amulets
Arabic words and phrases

tr:Muska